North Greenwich Bus Station serves the area of North Greenwich in the Royal Borough of Greenwich, Greater London, England. The station is owned and maintained by Transport for London.

The bus station is next to the  station and situated approximately 100 metres away from the O2 arena.

History

North Greenwich bus station was opened around the same time as the tube station in May 1999 as part of the Jubilee line extension. The Millennium Dome was the main attraction during that time. The bus and tube stations are located quite close to the southern portals of the Blackwall Tunnel.

The bus station is accessible via escalator from the tube station. The design, by Foster and Partners, incorporates a sweeping aerofoil shaped roof canopy. There is extensive use of glass. There are five stands within the bus station.

References

Gallery

External links
 Buses from North Greenwich - Transport for London

Bus stations in London
Transport in the Royal Borough of Greenwich